Norg can mean:

 Norg, a village in the Netherlands
 NORG, a character from the video game Final Fantasy VIII
 Norg, a character from the TV show Power Rangers: Operation Overdrive
 A shortened form of "news organization" or news agency